The National Highway 305 or the N-305 is one of Pakistan National Highway running from Sakrand to the city of Nawabshah in Sindh province of Pakistan. Its total length is 35 km, the highway is maintained and operated by Pakistan's National Highway Authority.

See also

References

External links
 National Highway Authority

Roads in Pakistan